Eduardo 'Edu' Bedia Peláez (born 23 March 1989) is a Spanish professional footballer who plays as a central midfielder for Indian Super League club Goa.

Club career

Spain and Germany
Born in Santander, Cantabria, Bedia was a product of his hometown club Racing de Santander's youth ranks, making his first-team (and La Liga) debut on 24 September 2008 by starting and playing the first half of a 2–0 away loss against Villarreal CF. In a season where the main squad eventually escaped relegation while still having to appear in the UEFA Cup, he managed to take part in a further 16 competitive games, scoring goals against FC Honka and Real Murcia, the former in European competition.

In January 2011, Bedia was loaned to UD Salamanca of the Segunda División, totalling 1,119 minutes of play during his five-month spell but suffering relegation. Subsequently, returned to Racing and the top flight, he met the same fate at the end of the campaign.

Bedia continued in the second division the following years, with Hércules CF and FC Barcelona Atlètic. On 16 June 2014, both he and Barça B teammate Ilie Sánchez signed with TSV 1860 Munich of the German 2. Bundesliga.

On 13 July 2015, Bedia signed a two-year deal with Real Oviedo, newly promoted to the second tier. On 19 January 2017, he moved to fellow league team Real Zaragoza.

Goa
On 2 September 2017, Bedia joined Indian Super League franchise FC Goa on a two-year contract. In his second season, he scored seven goals as the side reached the final; this put him fifth on the goalscoring charts led by compatriot teammate Coro.

In June 2020, Bedia signed a new two-year contract. He was appointed as captain ahead of that season, and represented them in the 2021 edition of the AFC Champions League, scoring in a 2–1 defeat at Persepolis F.C. on 20 April; in the process, he became the first player to achieve this feat for an Indian club in the competition's group stage.

Bedia appeared with his side in the 2021 Durand Cup: in the semi-finals, he was named player of the match as they defeated Bengaluru FC 7–6 in sudden death. In the decisive game, against Mohammedan SC on 3 October, he scored the lone goal through an extra-time free kick.

Career statistics

Honours
Goa
ISL League Winners Shield: 2019–20
Super Cup: 2019
Durand Cup: 2021

Spain U20
Mediterranean Games: 2009

References

External links

FC Barcelona official profile 

1989 births
Living people
Spanish footballers
Footballers from Santander, Spain
Association football midfielders
La Liga players
Segunda División players
Segunda División B players
Tercera División players
Rayo Cantabria players
Racing de Santander players
UD Salamanca players
Hércules CF players
FC Barcelona Atlètic players
Real Oviedo players
Real Zaragoza players
2. Bundesliga players
TSV 1860 Munich players
Indian Super League players
FC Goa players
Spain youth international footballers
Spain under-21 international footballers
Competitors at the 2009 Mediterranean Games
Mediterranean Games medalists in football
Mediterranean Games gold medalists for Spain
Spanish expatriate footballers
Expatriate footballers in Germany
Expatriate footballers in India
Spanish expatriate sportspeople in Germany
Spanish expatriate sportspeople in India